There are at least 59 members of the Ginseng and Parsley order: Apiales found in Montana.  Some of these species are exotics (not native to Montana) and some species have been designated as Species of Concern.

Ginseng
Family:  Araliaceae
Aralia nudicaulis, wild sarsaparilla
Oplopanax horridus, devil's-club

Parsley

Family:  Apiaceae

Angelica arguta, Lyall's angelica
Angelica dawsonii, Dawson's angelica
Angelica pinnata, small-leaf angelica
Angelica roseana, rock angelica
Anthriscus cerefolium, common chervil
Berula erecta, wild parsnip
Bupleurum americanum, American thorowax
Carum carvi, common caraway
Cicuta bulbifera, bulb-bearing water-hemlock
Cicuta douglasii, western water-hemlock
Cicuta maculata, spotted water-hemlock
Conioselinum scopulorum, hemlock parsley
Conium maculatum, poison-hemlock
Cymopterus acaulis, plains spring-parsley
Cymopterus bipinnatus, snow spring-parsley
Cymopterus glaucus, waxy spring-parsley
Cymopterus hendersonii, Henderson's wavewing
Cymopterus longilobus, Henderson's wavewing
Cymopterus terebinthinus, turpentine wavewing
Cymopterus terebinthinus var. terebinthus
Cymopterus terebinthinus var. foeniculaceus
Daucus carota, wild carrot
Heracleum lanatum, cow-parsnip
Ligusticum canbyi, canby's wild lovage
Ligusticum filicinum, fern-leaf lovage
Ligusticum tenuifolium, slender-leaf lovage
Lomatium ambiguum, Wyeth biscuitroot
Lomatium attenuatum, taper-tip desert-parsley
Lomatium bicolor, bicolor biscuitroot
Lomatium cous, cous biscuitroot
Lomatium cusickii, Cusick's desert-parsley
Lomatium dissectum, fernleaf biscuitroot
Lomatium foeniculaceum, carrotleaf desert-parsley
Lomatium geyeri, Geyer's biscuitroot
Lomatium macrocarpum, large-fruit desert-parsley
Lomatium nuttallii, Nuttall desert-parsley
Lomatium orientale, oriental desert-parsley
Lomatium sandbergii, Sandberg's biscuitroot
Lomatium triternatum, nineleaf biscuitroot
Lomatium triternatum, nineleaf biscuitroot
Lomatium triternatum, umbrella desert-parsley
Musineon divaricatum, wild parsley
Musineon vaginatum, Rydberg's parsley
Orogenia linearifolia, Great Basin Indian-potato
Osmorhiza chilensis, Chilean sweet-cicely
Osmorhiza depauperata, blunt-fruit sweet-cicely
Osmorhiza longistylis, smoother sweet-cicely
Osmorhiza occidentalis, western sweet-cicely
Osmorhiza purpurea, purple sweet-cicely
Pastinaca sativa, wild parsnip
Perideridia gairdneri, Gairdner's yampah
Pimpinella saxifraga, burnet-saxifrage
Sanicula graveolens, Sierra sanicle
Sanicula marilandica, Maryland black snakeroot
Shoshonea pulvinata, shoshonea
Sium suave, hemlock water-parsnip
Zizia aptera, golden alexanders

See also
 List of dicotyledons of Montana

Notes

Further reading
 

Montana
Flora of the Rocky Mountains